New Suffolk School is a historic school building located at New Suffolk in Suffolk County, New York. It was built in 1907 and is a one-story, hip-roofed structure on a raised brick basement, with an engaged two-story central tower. Originally a two-room schoolhouse, it was expanded to three rooms in 1923. It features compound massing, complex roof form and eyebrow windows of the Queen Anne and Shingle styles and the Tuscan porch columns and oval windows common to the Colonial Revival style.

It was added to the National Register of Historic Places in 2002.

References

School buildings on the National Register of Historic Places in New York (state)
School buildings completed in 1907
Schools in Suffolk County, New York
National Register of Historic Places in Suffolk County, New York
1907 establishments in New York (state)